is a Japanese voice actress. Her major roles include Kyoka Jiro in My Hero Academia, Gentoku in Ikki Tousen, Kuro Kagami in Kodomo no Jikan, Madoka Amano in Metal Fight Beyblade, and Naomasa in Horizon in the Middle of Nowhere. In video games she voices Mian in Dream Club, Rionera in Atelier Rorona: The Alchemist of Arland, and Tamaki in Code 18.

Filmography

Anime

Film

Video games

Dubbing

Audio recordings

Other roles

References

External links
 Official agency profile 
 Kei Shindo at GamePlaza-Haruka- Voice Actor DataBase 
 Kei Shindo at Hitoshi Doi's Seiyuu Database
 

Year of birth missing (living people)
Living people
Voice actresses from Chiba Prefecture
Japanese video game actresses
Japanese voice actresses